The Bavarian State Mint is a European mint located in the city of Munich.

It is one of the four German coin mints, the others being the Staatliche Münzen Baden-Württemberg, the Staatliche Münze Berlin, and the Hamburgische Münze. All coins from the BCM contain a 'D' mint mark for tracking purposes. The Bavarian State Mint has been in operation since 1871 CE.

See also

Staatliche Münze Berlin
Staatliche Münzen Baden-Württemberg
Hamburgische Münze
Euro
Bavaria (Bayern)

External links 

 Official website (in English)

Mints of Germany